Joseph Washington Bryant (born October 19, 1954), nicknamed "Jellybean", is an American former professional basketball player and coach. He played for the Philadelphia 76ers, San Diego Clippers, and Houston Rockets of the National Basketball Association (NBA). He also played for several teams in Italy and one in France. Bryant was the head coach of the WNBA's Los Angeles Sparks from 2005 to 2007 and returned to that position for the remainder of the 2011 WNBA season. Bryant has also coached in Italy, Japan, and Thailand.

Professional career

Philadelphia 76ers (1975–1979) 
After starring at La Salle University, Bryant, a 6'9" (2.06 m) forward, was drafted in the first round by the Golden State Warriors in the 1975. Before the season started, though, he was traded to his hometown team, the Philadelphia 76ers, where he played for four seasons. In his second season, the 1976–1977 76ers team, featured NBA all-stars Julius Erving, Doug Collins, and George McGinnis, they reached the 1977 NBA Finals, but eventually lost to the Portland Trail Blazers, 4 games to 2.

San Diego Clippers (1979–1982) 
Before the 1979–1980 season, the Sixers traded Bryant to the San Diego Clippers, where he spent three seasons. In the first game of the 1979–1980 season, played at home against the Los Angeles Lakers, Bryant memorably had a slam dunk over center Kareem Abdul-Jabbar. Despite the dunk and a 46-point effort by teammate Lloyd Free (who had also been his teammate on the Sixers), the Lakers prevailed on a game-winning sky hook by Abdul-Jabbar.

Houston Rockets (1982-1983)
Following the 1981 season, Bryant played one season for the Houston Rockets.

Europe (1983–1992)

Bryant played overseas in Italy and France from 1982–1992. He ended his playing career in 1992.

Coaching career

Akiba Hebrew Academy (1992–1993) 
Bryant's first coaching position, after returning from Europe, was when he was deployed with the U.S. Armed Forces in Italy. In the 1992–1993 season, he served as the head coach of the women's varsity team at Akiba Hebrew Academy in Lower Merion, Pennsylvania.

La Salle Explorers (1993–1996) 
In June 1993, he left Akiba and accepted an assistant coach position at his alma mater, La Salle University. On May 7, 1996, Bryant resigned from La Salle after his son Kobe announced his intentions to enter the NBA out of high school.

Diablos (2003) 
Bryant served as coach for the Diablos during the 2003 season of SlamBall, in which the team posted a record of 4–6 and finished seventh place.

Los Angeles Sparks (2005–2007) 
On August 22, 2005, Bryant, who was an assistant coach for the WNBA team Los Angeles Sparks, was named the head coach, succeeding previous coach (and former 76ers teammate) Henry Bibby. During the 2006 season, he led the Sparks to a 25–9 record and a Conference Finals berth. However, in April 2007, Bryant was replaced as Sparks head coach by Michael Cooper, who had previously helmed the team in 1999–2004.

Tokyo Apache (2007–2008) 
Bryant spent the 2007–2008 season coaching the Tokyo Apache of the Japanese BJ League, during which the team was the runner-up in the playoffs.

Sebastiani Rieti (2009–2010) 
On July 3, 2009, Bryant signed a contract with his first Italian club, Sebastiani Rieti. The 2009–2010 season was also the club's last.

Levanga Hokkaido (2010–2011) 
Bryant served as the head coach of Japanese professional basketball team Levanga Hokkaido during the 2010–2011 JBL season.

Bangkok Cobras (2012–2013) 
In January 2012, Bryant was hired as coach of the Bangkok Cobras in the ASEAN Basketball League (ABL). He coached for the 2012–2013 season.

Rising Fukuoka (2015) 
Bryant served as the head coach of Rizing Fukuoka of the BJ League during 2015.

Head coaching record

WNBA

|- 
| style="text-align:left;"|Los Angeles Sparks
| style="text-align:left;"|2005
| 6||4||2|||| style="text-align:center;"|4th in Western|||2||0||2||
| style="text-align:center;"|Lost Conference Semifinals
|-
| style="text-align:left;"|Los Angeles Sparks
| style="text-align:left;"|2006
| 34||25||9|||| style="text-align:center;"|1st in Western|||5||2||3||
| style="text-align:center;"|Lost Conference Finals
|-
| style="text-align:left;"|Los Angeles Sparks
| style="text-align:left;"|2011
| 24||11||13|||| style="text-align:center;"|5th in Western|||–||–||–||
| style="text-align:center;"|–
|-

Japan

|- 
| style="text-align:left;"|Tokyo Apache
| style="text-align:left;"|2005–2006
| 40||20||20|||| style="text-align:center;"|3rd|||–||–||–||
| style="text-align:center;"|–
|-
| style="text-align:left;"|Tokyo Apache
| style="text-align:left;"|2006–2007
| 40||12||28|||| style="text-align:center;"|8th|||–||–||–||
| style="text-align:center;"|–
|-
| style="text-align:left;"|Tokyo Apache
| style="text-align:left;"|2007–2008
| 44||27||17|||| style="text-align:center;"|2nd in Eastern|||2||1||1||
| style="text-align:center;"|Runners-up
|-
| style="text-align:left;"|Tokyo Apache
| style="text-align:left;"|2008–2009
| 52||33||19|||| style="text-align:center;"|2nd in Eastern|||4||3||1||
| style="text-align:center;"|Runners-up
|-
| style="text-align:left;"|Rera Kamuy Hokkaido
| style="text-align:left;"|2010–2011
| 22||6||16|||| style="text-align:center;"|Fired|||–||–||–||
| style="text-align:center;"|–
|-
| style="text-align:left;"|Rizing Fukuoka
| style="text-align:left;"|2014–2015
| 32||9||23|||| style="text-align:center;"|9th in Western|||–||–||–||
| style="text-align:center;"|–
|-

Personal life 
In 1975, Bryant married Pam Cox, sister of former NBA player Chubby Cox. Their son, Kobe, had a 20-year Hall of Fame career with the Los Angeles Lakers, winning five NBA championships. Kobe, along with his daughter Gianna, died in a helicopter crash in Calabasas, California on January 26, 2020. Bryant also has two daughters, Sharia and Shaya. Through his wife Pam, he is the uncle-in-law of professional basketball player John Cox IV.

References

External links 
 Joe Bryant at Basketball-Reference.com
 Joe Bryant WNBA Coach Profile
 Joe Bryant statistics in Italian Championship 

1954 births
Living people
African-American basketball coaches
African-American basketball players
African-American Catholics
American expatriate basketball people in France
American expatriate basketball people in Italy
American expatriate basketball people in Japan
American expatriate basketball people in Thailand
American men's basketball players
AMG Sebastiani Basket players
Basketball coaches from Pennsylvania
Basketball players from Philadelphia
Bryant family
Catholics from Pennsylvania
Centers (basketball)
FC Mulhouse Basket players
Golden State Warriors draft picks
Houston Rockets players
John Bartram High School alumni
La Salle Explorers men's basketball coaches
La Salle Explorers men's basketball players
Levanga Hokkaido coaches
Los Angeles Sparks head coaches
Olimpia Basket Pistoia players
Pallacanestro Reggiana players
Philadelphia 76ers players
Power forwards (basketball)
Rizing Zephyr Fukuoka coaches
San Diego Clippers players
Small forwards
Sportspeople from Philadelphia
Tokyo Apache coaches
Viola Reggio Calabria players